The Young Virgin or The Virgin Mary as a Child in Ecstacy is a 1632-1633 painting by Francisco de Zurbarán. It is now in the collection of the Metropolitan Museum of Art in New York.

References

1633 paintings
Paintings by Francisco de Zurbarán
Paintings in the collection of the Metropolitan Museum of Art
Paintings of the Virgin Mary